The 1975 Greenlandic Men's Football Championship was the 5th edition of the Greenlandic Men's Football Championship. The final round was held in Aasiaat. It was won by Grønlands Seminarius Sportklub who defeated G-44 Qeqertarsuaq 2–0 in the final.

Final standings

See also
Football in Greenland
Football Association of Greenland
Greenland national football team
Greenlandic Men's Football Championship

References

Greenlandic Men's Football Championship seasons
Green
Green
Football - Men